Pearl Jam is an American alternative rock band that formed in Seattle, Washington, in 1990. Since its inception, the band's line-up has included Eddie Vedder (lead vocals, guitar), Jeff Ament (bass guitar), Stone Gossard (rhythm guitar), and Mike McCready (lead guitar). The band's current drummer is Matt Cameron, formerly of Soundgarden, who has been with the band since 1998. Pearl Jam signed to Epic Records in 1991. Pearl Jam's debut studio album, Ten, broke the band into the mainstream. The single "Jeremy" received Grammy Award nominations for Best Rock Song and Best Hard Rock Performance in 1993. Pearl Jam received four awards at the 1993 MTV Video Music Awards for its music video for "Jeremy", including Video of the Year and Best Group Video. Ten was ranked number 207 on Rolling Stone magazine's list of the 500 greatest albums of all time, and "Jeremy" was ranked number 11 on VH1's list of the 100 greatest songs of the '90s.

The band's second studio album, Vs., released in 1993, was nominated for a Grammy Award for Best Rock Album in 1995. From Vs., the song "Daughter" received a Grammy nomination for Best Rock Performance by a Duo or Group with Vocal, and the song "Go" received a Grammy nomination for Best Hard Rock Performance. In 1994, the band released its third studio album, Vitalogy. The album received Grammy nominations for Album of the Year and Best Rock Album in 1996. Vitalogy was ranked number 492 on Rolling Stone magazine's list of the 500 greatest albums of all time. The lead single "Spin the Black Circle" won a Grammy Award in 1996 for Best Hard Rock Performance. Pearl Jam has subsequently released No Code in 1996, Yield in 1998, Binaural in 2000, Riot Act in 2002, the eponymous Pearl Jam in 2006, Backspacer in 2009, and Lightning Bolt in 2013. The songs "Do the Evolution" (from Yield) and "Grievance" (from Binaural) both received Grammy nominations for Best Hard Rock Performance. Pearl Jam's contribution to the 2003 film Big Fish, "Man of the Hour", was nominated for a Golden Globe Award in 2004. The band was placed at number 21 on VH1's list of the 100 greatest artists of hard rock.

American Music Awards
The American Music Awards is an annual awards ceremony created by Dick Clark in 1973. Pearl Jam has received five awards from nine nominations.

|-
|rowspan="2" align="center"|  ||rowspan="2"| Pearl Jam || Favorite Pop/Rock New Artist || 
|-
| Favorite New Heavy Metal/Hard Rock Artist || 
|-
|rowspan="2" align="center"|  ||rowspan="2"| Pearl Jam || Favorite Pop/Rock Band/Duo/Group || 
|-
| Favorite Heavy Metal/Hard Rock Artist || 
|-
|align="center"|  || Pearl Jam || Favorite Heavy Metal/Hard Rock Artist || 
|-
|rowspan="2" align="center"|  ||rowspan="2"| Pearl Jam || Favorite Alternative Artist || 
|-
| Favorite Heavy Metal/Hard Rock Artist || 
|-
|align="center"|  || Pearl Jam || Favorite Alternative Artist || 
|-
|align="center"|  || Pearl Jam || Favorite Alternative Artist ||

Broadcast Film Critics Association Awards
The Broadcast Film Critics Association Awards are awarded annually by the Broadcast Film Critics Association. Pearl Jam has received one nomination.

|-
|align="center"| 2004 || "Man of the Hour" from Big Fish || Best Song ||

Esky Music Awards
The Esky Music Awards are awarded annually by Esquire magazine. Pearl Jam has received one award from one nomination.

|-
|align="center"| 2006 || Pearl Jam || Best Live Act ||

GAFFA Awards

Denmark GAFFA Awards
Delivered since 1991, the GAFFA Awards are a Danish award that rewards popular music by the magazine of the same name. Pearl Jam has received two awards out of six nominations.

!
|-
| rowspan="3"| 1993
| rowspan="2"| Pearl Jam
| Most Underrated
| 
| style="text-align:center;" rowspan="6"|
|-
| Band
| 
|-
| Vs.
| Album of the Year
| 
|-
| 1994
| rowspan="2"| Pearl Jam
| Foreign Name
| 
|-
| 2000
| Best Foreign Live Act
| 
|-
|}

Golden Globe Awards
The Golden Globe Awards are awarded annually by the Hollywood Foreign Press Association. Pearl Jam has received one nomination.

|-
|align="center"| 2004 || "Man of the Hour" from Big Fish || Best Original Song ||

Grammy Awards
The Grammy Awards are awarded annually by the National Academy of Recording Arts and Sciences. Pearl Jam has received two awards from fifteen nominations.

|-
|rowspan="2" align="center"| 1993 ||rowspan="2"| "Jeremy" || Best Rock Song || 
|-
| Best Hard Rock Performance || 
|-
|rowspan="3" align="center"| 1995 || "Daughter" || Best Rock Performance by a Duo or Group with Vocal || 
|-
| "Go" || Best Hard Rock Performance || 
|-
| Vs. || Best Rock Album || 
|-
|rowspan="3" align="center"| 1996 || "Spin the Black Circle" || Best Hard Rock Performance || 
|-
|rowspan="2"| Vitalogy || Album of the Year || 
|-
| Best Rock Album || 
|-
|rowspan="3" align="center"| 1999 ||rowspan="2"| "Do the Evolution" || Best Hard Rock Performance || 
|-
| Best Music Video, Short Form || 
|-
| Yield || Best Recording Package || 
|-
|align="center"| 2001 || "Grievance" || Best Hard Rock Performance || 
|-
|align="center"| 2010 || "The Fixer" || Best Rock Song || 
|-
|align="center"| 2011 || Backspacer || Best Rock Album || 
|-
|align="center"| 2015 || Lightning Bolt || Best Recording Package ||

Juno Awards
The Juno Awards are awarded annually by the Canadian Academy of Recording Arts and Sciences. Pearl Jam has received one nomination.

|-
|align="center"| 1995 || Vs. || Best Selling Album (Foreign or Domestic) ||

MTV Video Music Awards
The MTV Video Music Awards are awarded annually by MTV. Pearl Jam has received four awards from seven nominations.

|-
|align="center"|  || "Alive" || Best Alternative Video || 
|-
|rowspan="5" align="center"|  ||rowspan="5"| "Jeremy" || Video of the Year || 
|-
| Best Group Video || 
|-
| Best Metal/Hard Rock Video || 
|-
| Best Direction || 
|-
| Viewer's Choice || 
|-
|align="center"|  || "Life Wasted" || Best Special Effects ||

mtvU Woodie Awards
The mtvU Woodie Awards are awarded annually. Pearl Jam has received one nomination.

|-
|align="center"| 2006 || Pearl Jam || The Good Woodie ||

Radio Music Awards
The Radio Music Awards were awarded annually. Pearl Jam has received one nomination.

|-
|align="center"| 2005 || Pearl Jam || Artist of the Year/Alternative and Active Rock Radio ||

World Soundtrack Awards
The World Soundtrack Awards are awarded annually by the World Soundtrack Academy. Pearl Jam has received one nomination.

|-
|align="center"| 2004 || "Man of the Hour" from Big Fish || Best Original Song Written Directly for a Film ||

Miscellaneous awards and honors

Zootaxa, 3038: 45–50. Preview

References

External links
Pearl Jam's official website

Awards and Nominations
Lists of awards received by American musician
Lists of awards received by musical group